The 23rd Utah Senate District is located in Davis County. The current State Senator representing the 23rd district is Todd Weiler. Weiler was elected in the 2012 election.

Previous Utah State Senators (District 23)

Election results

2008 General Election

2004 General Election

See also

 Dan Eastman
 Utah Democratic Party
 Utah Republican Party
 Utah Senate

External links
 Utah Senate District Profiles
 Official Biography of Dan Liljenquist

23
Davis County, Utah